Yuxi Subdistrict may refer to the following locations in China:

Yuxi Subdistrict, Huangshan (昱西街道), in Tunxi District, Huangshan City, Anhui
Yuxi Subdistrict, Shijiazhuang (裕西街道), in Qiaoxi District, Shijiazhuang, Hebei